Mateusz Wieteska (born 11 February 1997) is a Polish professional footballer who plays as a centre-back for Ligue 1 club Clermont and the Poland national team.

Club career
On 7 July 2017, Wieteska signed a contract with Ekstraklasa side Górnik Zabrze. On 14 June 2018, his move to Legia Warsaw was announced.

On 25 July 2022, Ligue 1 club Clermont announced the signing of Wieteska, who joined the French side on a four-year contract.

International career
On 15 March 2022, Wieteska was called up by the Poland national team head coach Czesław Michniewicz for the friendly match against Scotland and the 2022 FIFA World Cup play-offs final against Sweden.

On 14 June 2022, he debuted for Poland as a starter against Belgium in a 2022–23 UEFA Nations League game.

Career statistics

Honours
Legia Warsaw
Ekstraklasa: 2016–17, 2019–20, 2020–21

References

External links

1997 births
Living people
Footballers from Warsaw
Polish footballers
Association football defenders
Poland international footballers
Poland youth international footballers
Poland under-21 international footballers
Ekstraklasa players
I liga players
III liga players
Ligue 1 players
Legia Warsaw players
Legia Warsaw II players
Ząbkovia Ząbki players
Chrobry Głogów players
Górnik Zabrze players
Clermont Foot players
2022 FIFA World Cup players
Polish expatriate footballers
Expatriate footballers in France
Polish expatriate sportspeople in France
Pogoń Grodzisk Mazowiecki players